WMKP may refer to:

 WMKP-LP, a low-power radio station (98.9 FM) licensed to serve Oakwood, Georgia, United States
 Penang International Airport (ICAO code WMKP)